Yaacov (Yacov) Bleiman (September 8, 1947, Vilnius – June, 2004) was a Lithuanian–Israeli chess master.

Bleiman spent a decade designing a smart bomb that was procured by the Israeli Air Force for its F-16 fighter jets in 2003.

Chess 
In 1965, Bleiman played in World Junior Championship in Barcelona (Bojan Kurajica won). In 1971, he tied for 7-8th in Netanya (Lubomir Kavalek and Bruno Parma won).
In 1976, he tied for 3-4th in Netanya (Avraham Kaldor and Itchak Radashkovich won).

He played for Israel in three Chess Olympiads.
In 1970, at second reserve board in 19th Olympiad in Siegen (+4 –0 =5);
In 1974, at first reserve board in 21st Olympiad in Nice (+6 –1 =8);
In 1978, at fourth board in 23rd Olympiad in Buenos Aires (+3 –1 =3).
He also represented Israel in the 7th European Team Chess Championship at Skara 1980.

Bleiman was awarded the International Master (IM) title in 1971.

References

External links

Yaacov Bleiman at Chessmetrics

1947 births
2004 deaths
Sportspeople from Vilnius
Lithuanian Jews
Soviet emigrants to Israel
Israeli people of Lithuanian-Jewish descent
Jewish chess players
Israeli chess players
Lithuanian chess players
Chess International Masters
Chess Olympiad competitors
20th-century chess players